Luca Pizzini (born 8 April 1989) is an Italian swimmer specialized in breaststroke. A junior medallist at both European and World Championships, he earned bronze medals in the 2013 Summer Universiade and the 2016 European Aquatics Championships. He also competed in the men's 200 metre breaststroke event at the 2016 Summer Olympics.

At the 2022 European Aquatics Championships, contested in August at Foro Italico in Rome, Pizzini won the bronze medal in the 200 metre breaststroke with a time of 2:09.97.

References

External links

1989 births
Living people
Italian male swimmers
Italian male breaststroke swimmers
Olympic swimmers of Italy
Swimmers at the 2016 Summer Olympics
Sportspeople from Verona
European Aquatics Championships medalists in swimming
Mediterranean Games gold medalists for Italy
Mediterranean Games bronze medalists for Italy
Mediterranean Games medalists in swimming
Swimmers at the 2009 Mediterranean Games
Swimmers at the 2018 Mediterranean Games
Universiade medalists in swimming
Universiade bronze medalists for Italy
Medalists at the 2013 Summer Universiade
20th-century Italian people
21st-century Italian people